Tiger Brennan Drive is a major arterial road in the western suburbs of Darwin, Northern Territory, Australia. The road travels southeast–east starting from Darwin CBD toward Darwin's eastern suburb of Berrimah, then continues to a connection with the Stuart Highway at Palmerston. Tiger Brennan Drive runs parallel with the Stuart Highway for most of its length. The road was named after Harold "Tiger" Brennan, a long serving Northern Territory politician and former mayor of Darwin. The Berrimah Road to Stuart Highway Section has been assigned the alphanumeric route designation A15.

Overview
Tiger Brennan Drive provides the most direct route for freight coming to and from the East Arm Port, instead of using the busy Stuart Highway which runs through established suburbs. Following the completion of major extension works in 2010, the original sections built as single carriageway in stages between 1987 and 1997 are being progressively upgraded to dual carriageway standard.

Most major junctions on Tiger Brennan Drive are controlled by traffic lights, however the road is designed to be upgraded to freeway standard, with some suburban streets connected via limited access slip roads. Additionally, grade separated junctions are provided at Hidden Valley Road and the interchange with the Stuart Highway. Major roads intersecting Tiger Brennan Drive include Amy Johnson Avenue, Woolner Road, Berrimah Road and Tivendale Road. The road provides the primary access to Charles Darwin National Park.

Tiger Brennan Drive extension 
Stage 1 - Construction of the $6.5 million Tiger Brennan Drive extension involving the duplication of Berrimah Road to provide easier access to the East Arm Port and ease traffic congestion on other major arterial roads in the Darwin urban area was completed in 2009.

Stage 2 - Tiger Brennan Drive Extension Stage 2 for the Department of Planning and Infrastructure (DPI) of the Northern Territory Government was completed in 2010.  The project comprised the construction of 7.5 km of highway standard
dual carriageway road between Berrimah Road and Palmerston, including a grade-separated interchange with the Stuart Highway. and is worth approximately $100 million. The new extension will provides an alternative route to reduce travel time for approximately 34,000 vehicles using the Darwin to Palmerston corridor daily. The total construction cost of both stages was approximately $127 million.

In late 2012, work commenced on further upgrades to widen the 12 km section between McMinn Street in the Darwin CBD and Berrimah Road to four lane dual carriageway standard. The funding for this project was provided once again by cooperation between the Federal and Territory governments at an approximate cost of $100 million.

See also

References

External links 
 Northern Territory Transport Group
 Darwin to Palmerston transport corridor

Roads in Darwin, Northern Territory